John Swanwick Drennan (1809–1893) was an Irish poet.

Drennan was a son of William Drennan and a grandson of Thomas Drennan, minister of the First Presbyterian Church, Belfast. He had an elder brother, William Drennan (1802–73).

His poems, On the Telescopic Moon and Epigrams were featured in The Faber Book of Irish Verse in 1974.

External links
 http://www.sonnets.org/drennan.htm
 http://www.ricorso.net/rx/az-data/index.htm
 Glendalloch and Other Poems by William Drennan, including poems by John Swanwick Drennan

1809 births
1893 deaths
Irish poets
19th-century Irish poets